Two X was a South Korean girl group from J. Tune Entertainment that debuted in 2012. The group's initial line-up consisted of five members: Jiu, Minjoo, Eun, Surin, and Eunyoung. The group released three singles: "Double Up" (2012), "Ring Ma Bell" (2013), and "Over" (2016) before disbanding.

History

Debut and initial singles
On August 16, 2012, Two X made their stage debut on the music television program M Countdown and released their debut single "Double Up". This was followed shortly by their second single "Ring Ma Bell".

Hiatus and changes to label and line-up
In 2014, Two X ended their contract with J. Tune Camp and signed a record deal with Star Gaze Entertainment.

In January 2016, it was announced that key member Min-joo had left the group.

On August 23, 2016, the group released the song "Over" in promotion of their new , Reboot. It was their first release in three years and their first release as a four-member group.

During the later half of 2017, Two X ceased activities. On June 26, 2018, when a fan asked Eun on Instagram if Two X was disbanded, she confirmed the disbandment.

Members
Jiu
Minjoo
Eun
Surin
Eunyoung

Discography

Single albums

Singles

References

External links

Two X's Cafe Daum profile

J. Tune Entertainment artists
K-pop music groups
Musical groups established in 2012
South Korean dance music groups
South Korean girl groups
2012 establishments in South Korea